Federico Delbonis was the defending champion but chose not to participate.

Mischa Zverev won the title, defeating Gerald Melzer 6–4, 7–6(7–2) in the final.

Seeds

Draw

Finals

Top half

Bottom half

References
Main Draw
Qualifying Draw

Sarasota Open - Singles